Juha Hänninen (born 11 September 1959) is a Finnish boxer. He competed in the men's light heavyweight event at the 1984 Summer Olympics.

References

1959 births
Living people
Finnish male boxers
Olympic boxers of Finland
Boxers at the 1984 Summer Olympics
Sportspeople from Oulu
Light-heavyweight boxers